Dave Gorman: Modern Life Is Goodish is a British comedy television show that ran for five series between 2013 and 2017. It was broadcast on Dave and presented by Dave Gorman. The series mainly consisted of Gorman presenting comedic PowerPoint presentations in which he attempts to argue that modern life is neither bad or good, but "good...ish". The series began on 17 September 2013. A fifth series began airing on 31 October 2017. Gorman announced on 18 December 2017 that the show would conclude after the final episode of series 5 aired the following night.

Format
Each episode sees Gorman present a stand-up show using PowerPoint, on a particular theme about modern life. Examples include celebrity culture and social media. Each episode features a recurring section called the "Found Poem", in which Gorman reads out a selection of bizarre comments left on news websites, all covering a particular story. Gorman performs the Found Poem with a lone spotlight shining on him, while accompanied by the Billroth String Quartet (Billroth Ensemble from Series 4) playing 'Sarabande' from George Frideric Handel's Keyboard suite in D minor (HWV 437). The title of each episode comes from a line out of the Found Poem.

Production
The programmes were recorded at the Tabernacle, Notting Hill. The episodes were recorded in pairs. Prior to the final recordings, Gorman did "dry run" performances of each episode's content in small theatres. Gorman frequently rewrote portions of the performance after the dry runs.

The show was labour-intensive to create; in the final three weeks before taping a pair of episodes, Gorman would work for over 100 hours a week. The heavy workload was one of the contributing factors to the decision to end the show in 2017. Another factor was Gorman's decision to tour in 2018.

The show's title is similar to that of the 1993 Blur album Modern Life Is Rubbish. When asked if the title was an intentional reference, Gorman said 'I think it's a Blur reference if you want it to be. The "rubbish" version, I think, comes to mind anyway. I just like that'.

Series overview

Episodes

Series 1 (2013)

Series 2 (2014)

Series 3 (2015)

Goodish Hits (2016)

Series 4 (2016)
Series 4 of Modern Life Is Goodish was confirmed on 7 August 2015. The series contained only 6 episodes because Gorman took a break to look after his expected baby. The show began airing on Dave on 8 November 2016.

Series 5 (2017)
Series 5 of Modern Life Is Goodish was also confirmed on 7 August 2015; the series contained 8 episodes. It was confirmed on 18 December 2017, by Gorman, that there would be no sixth series.

Notes

References

External links
 
 
 

2010s British comedy television series
2010s British satirical television series
2013 British television series debuts
2017 British television series endings
British satirical television series
British stand-up comedy television series
Dave (TV channel) original programming
English-language television shows